is a Japanese manga written and illustrated by Kei, the original artist of Vocaloid 2 Hatsune Miku. The manga was originally based on Miku, but came to feature other Vocaloid 1 and 2 characters as the series progressed. The manga was serialized in Jive's shōnen manga magazine Comic Rush between the January 2008 and December 2010 issues. However, the characters and settings depicted in this manga are not official. It is licensed for distribution in North America by Dark Horse Comics, who released the entire series in one volume in 2014.

Plot
Each chapter in Hatsune Miku: Unofficial Hatsune Mix is a self contained story and there is often little to connect two chapters together. Despite this, they still form a rough chronological order, taking into account the first appearances of the different characters. The series is set in Sapporo, Japan as that is the location of Crypton Future Media, the developers of Hatsune Miku and related software. The characters share personality traits that were influenced by the Vocaloid fan community. Items and food associated with the Vocaloids are also depicted. Kasane Teto also makes several guest appearances within the series.

Characters

Meiko, known as Onee-san (お姉さん, big sister)
Kaito, known as Onii-san (お兄さん, big brother)
 (guest appearance)

The characters who appear in the manga are used differently in every storyline and their personalities are subject to change.  For example in "Mermaid Mix", Miku appears as a mermaid trying to win the affection of a Prince (Kaito) was kidnapped by a temptress (Meiko).

Manga
The manga was serialized in Jive's shōnen manga magazine Comic Rush between the January 2008 and December 2010 issues. Three tankōbon volumes were released in Japan between December 7, 2008 and November 6, 2010. Dark Horse Comics licensed the manga for distribution in North America.

Notes and references

The chapter "Abandoned Mix" is not included in volume one, and the orders of chapters in volume two and three are different from that in Comic Rush.

External links
Comic Rush's official website 

2007 manga
Shōnen manga
Creative works using vocaloids
Dark Horse Comics titles